Ahmed Fathi Mohamed Mahmoud Mohamed, more commonly known as Bogy, (born January 30, 1989, in Ismailia, Egypt) is an Egyptian Former footballer who played as a striker. He shares a nickname with Egyptian wrestler Mohamed Abdelfatah.

An Egyptian youth international, Bogy was a member of the Egypt national under-20 football team at the 2009 FIFA U-20 World Cup, which Egypt hosted.

Club career
In January 2014, Bogy signed an 18-month contract with Algerian club CR Belouizdad. On January 18, he made his debut for CRB, coming on as a second-half substitute in a league match against RC Arbaâ. At the end of the season, he was released by the club.

International career
Bogy currently plays for the Egyptian U-23 national youth team. He took part in all Egypt's matches the 2009 FIFA U-20 World Cup that was hosted by Egypt from September 25 to October 16.

Bogy's highlight in the 2009 FIFA U-20 World Cup was scoring a double versus Italy after coming off the bench in the second-half.

References

1989 births
Living people
Egyptian footballers
Egypt international footballers
Egyptian expatriate footballers
Association football forwards
Expatriate footballers in Algeria
Expatriate footballers in Iraq
El Qanah FC players
Zamalek SC players
Misr Lel Makkasa SC players
Al-Talaba SC players
CR Belouizdad players
Tersana SC players
Algerian Ligue Professionnelle 1 players
Egyptian expatriate sportspeople in Algeria
Egyptian Premier League players